Bahlul Kandi (also Romanized as Bahlūl Kandī) is a village in Chaybasar-e Sharqi Rural District, in the Central District of Poldasht County, West Azerbaijan Province, Iran. At the 2006 census, its population was 717, in 150 families.

References 

Populated places in Poldasht County